Tylopilus ferrugineus is a bolete fungus in the family Boletaceae native to North America. Originally described by Charles Christopher Frost in 1874 as Boletus ferrugineus, it was placed in the genus Tylopilus by Rolf Singer in 1947.

See also
List of North American boletes

References

External links

ferrugineus
Fungi described in 1874
Fungi of the United States
Fungi without expected TNC conservation status